"Higher Power" is the final episode of seaQuest DSV's first season. It was originally shown on May 22, 1994.

Plot
World Power, an underwater power plant, led by Dr. Lawrence Wolenczak (Lucas' father), prepares to offer the entire planet free electricity.

Bridger addresses the crew and thanks them for their dedication over the course of the tour of duty.

The ocean floor underneath the massive turbines begins to crack open, causing lava to spill into the water. As Bridger and Kristin sit down to dinner, Secretary General Noyce appears on the vidlink and explains the situation. Bridger claims that Dr. Wolenczak is a smart man and should be able to find a solution to the problem, but Noyce claims that the word is that Wolenczak is dead. Watching from the bridge, Lucas is immediately crushed and slumps back into a chair in shock. Bridger orders Commander Ford to set a course for World Power.

Arriving on the bridge, Bridger finds Lucas and inquires if he's okay. He says that Noyce made a giant assumption claiming that his father was dead and now Lucas is stuck with it. Going to alert on all stations, the seaQuest is rocked by a lava stream. As it struggles to stabilize, it is hit again. Bridger goes to his console and orders the crew to abandon the seaQuest. 
Dr. Wolenczak tells Bridger that it'll take an enormous force to plug the lava well. Bridger suggests one-million megatons, to which Wolenczak admits might work, but is unsure where they'd get such a force. Bridger knows though, if seaQuest was piloted into the heart of the well and detonated its warheads, it would exert such a force.

From the beach, the crew witnesses a massive explosion burst from underwater. They realize the worst, that their home and their captain are dead and gone. However, just as the last vestiges of the seaQuest burn up and explode within the lava well, the Stinger piloted by Bridger, makes a quick escape from the boiling inferno.

With the crew reunited and Lucas saying goodbye to his father, he asks Bridger what they're going to do and he points out that there's the small matter of building a new boat.

Background information
This episode features the final regular appearances of Dr. Kristin Westphalen, Lieutenant Commander Katherine Hitchcock, Chief Manilow Crocker and Lieutenant Benjamin Krieg (although, Krieg would later reappear in "In the Company of Ice and Profit"), as Stacy Haiduk (Hitchcock) had requested not to return for the second season, Stephanie Beacham (Westphalen) also declined to return, and Royce D. Applegate (Crocker) and John D'Aquino (Krieg) had been released from their NBC contracts.

For a period, it was unknown whether or not the series would be renewed for a second season. With that in mind, the producers decided to destroy the ship in the first season finale, so that if the series was canceled, the show would have ended on a note of a finality. When the series was picked back up, another seaQuest was designed (sets, such as the bridge, sea deck, med-bay, and launch bay were completely redesigned) and constructed at the show's new filming location in Florida.

This episode was originally known as "An Ocean on Fire", but, was ultimately changed to "Higher Power" prior to airing. NBC originally aired a short "Tonight on seaQuest..." promo just prior to the episode's airing, which is available for viewing on the first season DVD release.

When the seaQuest is first hit by the lava stream, O'Neill sends out a mayday giving the boat's location, but, mixes up the two numbers on the repeat.

SeaQuest DSV episodes
1994 American television episodes
Holography in fiction